The MacDonnell Regional Council is a local government area of the Northern Territory, Australia.

Geography
MacDonnell Regional Council occupies the south of the Northern Territory and is the only LGA that borders with South Australia, specifically with Anangu Pitjantjatjara Yankunytjatjara in the southwest and the Pastoral Unincorporated Area in the southeast.

Alice Springs and Yulara are enclaves within the LGA.

History
In October 2006 the Northern Territory Government announced the reform of local government areas. The intention of the reform was to improve and expand the delivery of services to towns and communities across the Northern Territory by establishing eleven new shires. The MacDonnell Shire Council was created on 1 July 2008, as were the remaining ten shires. Elections of shire councillors were held on 25 October 2008. 

Community Government Councils merged into the MacDonnell Shire, as did a large area of unincorporated area. The existing Community Government Councils and one regional council were:
 Amoonguna Community Incorporated
 Aputula Housing Association Incorporated
 Areyonga Community Incorporated
 Ikuntji Community Council Incorporated
 Imanpa Community Incorporated
 Kaltukatjara Community Council Aboriginal Corporation
 Ntaria Council Incorporated
 Papunya Community Council Incorporated
 Walungurru Council Aboriginal Corporation
 Wallace Rockhole Community Government Council
 Ltyentye Apurte Community Government Council
 Tapatjatjaka Community Government Council
 Watiyawanu Community Government Council

On 1 January 2014, the council was renamed MacDonnell Region.

Governance 
The current President (Mayor) of the MacDonnell Regional Council is Roxanne Kenny.

Wards
The MacDonnell Regional Council is divided into 4 wards, which are governed by 12 councillors:
 Rodinga (4)
 Ljirapinta (2)
 Luritja Pintubi (4)
 Iyarrka (3)

Towns by ward
The following towns fall within the four wards as follows:, with population figures as of 30 June 2007:
 Iyarrka
 Docker River (Kaltukatjara) (311)
 Imanpa (217)
 Areyonga (Utju) (245)
 Ljirapinta
 Hermannsburg (Ntaria) (600)
 Wallace Rockhole (Ulana) (107)
 Luritja Pintubi
 Haasts Bluff (Ikuntji) (165)
 Kintore (Walungurru) (350)
 Mount Liebig (Watijawanu) (252)
 Papunya (Warumpi) (342)
Rodinga
 Amoonguna (362)
 Aputula (Finke) (240)
 Santa Teresa (Ltyentye Apurte) (652 in 2006)
 Titjikala (Tapatjatjaka) (265)

Outstations
There are a number of small family outstations within MacDonnell Regional Council. These include:
Labrapuntja (population 11 in 2020)

References

External links
Official website
Map of LGAs
Policy details

 
Local government areas of the Northern Territory